The James B. Christie House is a large, flat-roofed Usonian on a wooded site in Bernardsville, in Somerset County, New Jersey, United States. The residence has one story and is made of brick, cypress, and redwood.

It is designed in an L-shaped plan with a rectangular living room and a dining area that is perpendicular to a wing with three bedrooms and three baths. The kitchen is in the corner of the L, like a hinge connecting the two sections, separating public from private areas. The flat roof with its overhanging soffit reinforces the sprawling horizontal design.

Wright advised James B. Christie, his first New Jersey client, to select a setting that has "as much individuality as to topography and features—stream, trees, etc. and as much freedom from adjacent buildings as is possible."

References
 Storrer, William Allin. The Frank Lloyd Wright Companion. University of Chicago Press, 2006,  (S.278)

External links
 Mr. and Mrs. James Bryan Christie House, Bernardsville, New Jersey, Exterior perspective from southwest. 1940. Graphite and color pencil on tracing paper, 18 × 35½" (45.7 × 90.2 cm). Gift of Edgar Kaufmann, Jr. © 2008 Frank Lloyd Wright Foundation / Artists Rights Society (ARS), New York
 Mr. and Mrs. James Bryan Christie House, Bernardsville, New Jersey, Exterior perspective from east. 1940. Graphite and color pencil on tracing paper, 18 × 35½" (45.7 × 90.2 cm). Gift of Edgar Kaufmann, Jr.
 Photos on Arcaid

Frank Lloyd Wright buildings
Houses in Somerset County, New Jersey